"Now and Then" is a song written by Gary Harrison and Karen Staley and recorded by Staley. It was released in 1989 as the second single from her debut album, Wildest Dreams. It peaked at number 87 on the Billboard Hot Country Singles chart. The song was later recorded by Canadian country music artist Michelle Wright. Wright's version was released in 1994 as the seventh single from her third studio album, Now and Then. It peaked at number 9 on the RPM Country Tracks chart in May 1994.

Chart performance

Karen Staley

Michelle Wright

References

1989 singles
1989 songs
1994 singles
Michelle Wright songs
Arista Nashville singles
MCA Records singles
Songs written by Gary Harrison
Songs written by Karen Staley